The following is a list of events and releases that have happened or are expected to happen in 2018 in African music.

Events
January 10 – The Premium Times lists Squeeze Tarela and Bella Alubo among its "Nigerian artistes to look out for in 2018".
January 13 – Youssou N'Dour, on tour in the Gambia, praises the Gambian people and expresses optimism for the country's future.
January 28 – At the 60th Annual Grammy Awards, Ladysmith Black Mambazo win the award for Best World Music Album with Shaka Zulu Revisited: 30th Anniversary Celebration and are nominated for the Best Children's Album award for Songs of Peace & Love for Kids & Parents Around the World.
March 30 – Announcement of the winner of the AfriMusic Song Contest 2018, the first pan-African song contest. Eswatini win the contest, represented by the song "Sengikhona", performed by Symphony (Zanele Cele).
June 2 – Rita Ray presents a major new series on BBC television: Africa: A Journey Into Music.
August 10 – The Minnesota Orchestra becomes the first American orchestra ever to perform in South Africa when it gives the first concert of its South African tour, at City Hall, Cape Town.

Albums released in 2018

Classical
Michael Blake – Lovedale Harmony (in memory of Siya Betana) (2017) for saxophone quartet

Deaths
January 3 – Lara Kruger, 30, South African DJ (Motsweding FM) and transgender rights activist
January 4 – Joseph Gunduza Magigwani, 37, Zimbabwean actor and gospel singer (traffic collision)
January 23 – Hugh Masekela, 78, South African jazz instrumentalist, composer and singer
February 1 – Mowzey Radio, 33, Ugandan musician (head injuries from a fight)
February 8 - Ebony Reigns, 20, Ghanaian singer (traffic collision)
March 19 – Shavey, Kenyan dancehall singer (traffic collision)
April 2 – Ahmed Janka Nabay, Sierra Leonean musician, 54
May 20 – N'Goran La Loi, Ivorian accordionist, husband and partner of Allah Thérèse, 87
June 10 – Ras Kimono, Nigerian reggae musician, 60
September 12 – Rachid Taha, Algerian singer (Carte de Séjour), 59 (heart attack)
October 3 – Joseph Kamaru, Kenyan benga musician and political activist, 79 (complications from Parkinson's disease)
October 24 – Hip Hop Pantsula, South African rapper, 38
November 13 – Brian Rusike, Zimbabwean songwriter and keyboardist, 62

See also 
 2018 in music

References 

Africa
African music
2018 in Africa